The Men's Indoor Hockey World Cup is an international indoor field hockey competition organised by the International Hockey Federation (FIH). The tournament was first held in 2003 and it is held every four years.

Format
Twelve qualified teams will be divided into two pools. The top two in their pool qualified for first to fourth classification, while third and fourth qualified for fifth to eighth classification, the last two teams will play for the last four placings.

Qualification
Qualification is set by the governing body, the International Hockey Federation. The qualified teams include the host country, continental champions and the most recent World Cup final ranking.

Summaries

Performance by nation

Team appearances

See also
Indoor hockey at the World Games
Men's FIH Hockey World Cup
Women's Indoor Hockey World Cup

References

External links
FIH website

 
World Cup
World championships in hockey variants
Recurring sporting events established in 2003